Pabedan Township is located in the center of downtown Yangon, Myanmar. The township is home to Bogyoke Aung San Market and Theingyi Market, two of the largest shopping centers in all of Yangon. The township consists of eleven wards, and shares borders with Kyauktada township in the east, Seikkan township and Yangon river in the south, Latha township in the west and Dagon township in the north.

The township has three primary schools, two middle schools, three high schools., and BEHS 2 Pabedan.

Landmarks
As Pabedan township was part of the original city plan implemented by the British, it is dotted with many colonial era buildings, including landmark buildings and structures protected by the city.

Gallery

References

Townships of Yangon